Persoonia stricta is a species of flowering plant in the family Proteaceae and is endemic to the south-west of Western Australia.

Description
Flowering occurs from August to December and the fruit is a smooth drupe.

Taxonomy
Persoonia stricta was first formally described in 1994 by Peter Weston in the journal Telopea from an unpublished description by Charles Gardner, the type specimens collected by Gardner from near Manmanning in 1931.

Distribution and habitat
This geebung grows in heath, thicket or woodland between Ajana and Manmanning in the Avon Wheatbelt, Geraldton Sandplains, Murchison, Swan Coastal Plain and Yalgoo biogeographic regions in the south-west of Western Australia.

Conservation status
Persoonia saundersiana is classified as "not threatened" by the Government of Western Australia Department of Parks and Wildlife.

References

stricta
Flora of Western Australia
Plants described in 1994
Taxa named by Peter H. Weston